Oh Boy is an album released by the Australian band The Paradise Motel in September 2013. This was their first independently released album, and the first to predominantly feature songwriter Charles Bickford as vocalist. Many of the songs concern masculinity and Australian culture.

The song 'The Spider' was released digitally as a single. Despite no touring and no promotion the album received positive reviews

Track listing

Personnel
 Merida Sussex – vocals
 Charles Bickford – vocals, guitar, keyboards
 Matt Aulich – guitars, arrangements
 Esme Macdonald – bass guitar
 Mark BJ Austin – keyboards, organ, pedal steel
 Andy Hazel – drums
 Campbell Shaw – violins

References

External links
Paradise Motel on Facebook

2013 albums
The Paradise Motel albums